Tale of Two Mice is a 1945 Warner Bros. cartoon in the Looney Tunes series, directed by a uncredited Frank Tashlin. It is a sequel to 1942's A Tale of Two Kitties, with the Abbott and Costello characterizations ("Babbit and Catstello") now cast as mice. They are voiced by Tedd Pierce and Mel Blanc respectively.

Plot
Catstello is being chased by a cat rapidly at high speed around the house, yelling "Hey Babbit!" Catstello narrowly escapes into the mousehole, while the cat crashes into a wall. Babbit notices this and asks Catstello for the cheese. Catsstello replies that he hasn't got any, because he is scared of the cat. Babbit then chastises Catstello for his cowardice, but he fails to change Catstello's behavior. Babbit then continuously slaps his partner on the head.

They attempt to steal cheese that is being guarded by a cat. Their schemes include creeping past a sleeping cat, which doesn't go so well as Catstello runs off at first time, a small airplane and a rope and pull system. Finally, Catstello manages to escape the cat with a wedge of Swiss cheese, which unfortunately Babbit doesn't like. Fed-up with Babbit constantly ordering him around and repetitively slapping him as well as his ingratitude for all of Catsello's efforts, Catstello continuously slaps him and force-feeds Babbit chunks of Swiss cheese, remarking "Ooohhh, I'm a baaaaaaad boy!"

Home media
Laserdisc - The Golden Age of Looney Tunes Volume 2 Side 3 Frank Tashlin
DVD - San Antonio (USA 1995 Turner print) 
DVD - TCM Spotlight: Errol Flynn Adventures (USA 1995 Turner print)

Notes
This cartoon was re-released into the Blue Ribbon Merrie Melodies program on January 10, 1953, retitled A Tale of Two Mice. Because the cartoon was re-released in the 1952-53 animation season, the Lydian "THE END" ending card is present in place of the original ending title card. Despite the re-release, the original opening and ending titles, as well as the title card and credits, are known to exist.

See also
Looney Tunes and Merrie Melodies filmography (1940–1949)

References

External links
 
 

1945 animated films
1945 short films
Looney Tunes shorts
Warner Bros. Cartoons animated short films
Short films directed by Frank Tashlin
Animation based on real people
Films scored by Carl Stalling
Cultural depictions of Abbott and Costello
1940s Warner Bros. animated short films
Animated films about mice
Animated films about cats